John Cobb may refer to:

People 
 John Cobb (Australian politician) (born 1950), Australian politician
 John Cobb (cabinetmaker) (c. 1710–1778), English cabinetmaker

 John Cobb (Manitoba politician) (1903–1959), Canadian politician
 John Cobb (pioneer) (1814–1893), American pioneer settler in California
 John Cobb (racing driver) (1899–1952), British racing driver and record holder
 John B. Cobb (born 1925), American theologian
 John Nathan Cobb (1868–1930), American fisheries researcher
 John Cobbe (1859–1944), Irish-born New Zealand politician
 John Cobb Cooper (1887–1967), American jurist, airline executive and presidential advisor
 John Robert Cobb (1903–1967), American orthopedic surgeon
 John Cobb (academic) (died 1725), warden of New College, Oxford

Ships 
 NOAAS John N. Cobb, a National Oceanic and Atmospheric Administration fisheries research ship in service from 1950 to 2008

See also
 Cobb (surname)